Wieprza is a river in north-western Poland in the region of Pomerania, a tributary of the Baltic Sea, with a length of  and a basin area of .

Towns
 Kępice
 Sławno
 Darłowo

See also
Rivers of Poland
List of rivers of Europe

1Wieprza
Rivers of Poland
Rivers of West Pomeranian Voivodeship
Rivers of Pomeranian Voivodeship